Formate dehydrogenase-N (Fdh-N, FdnGHI, nitrate-inducible formate dehydrogenase, formate dehydrogenase N, FDH-N, nitrate inducible Fdn, nitrate inducible formate dehydrogenase) is an enzyme with systematic name formate:quinone oxidoreductase. This enzyme catalyses the following chemical reaction

 formate + quinone  CO2 + quinol

This enzyme contains molybdopterin-guanine dinucleotides, five [4Fe-4S] clusters and two heme b groups.

References

External links 
 

EC 1.1.5